Serik Belediyespor Kulübü is a Turkish professional football club established in the Serik district of Antalya province in 1955. The club colours are green and white and they play their home matches at İsmail Oğan Stadium.

History 

In the 2015–16 season, he started competing in the Regional Amateur League for the first time in his history. Serik Belediyespor finished the Group 7 as champion with 62 points in the 2017–18 Regional Amateur League and qualified for play-offs. The team beat Ödemişspor 5–0 in the first round of the play-off, and promoted to the professional league for the first time in its history.

President Rakip Utan, who carried the team to the professional league, resigned after the season. Ali Aksu was elected President at the extraordinary general assembly held on 9 June 2018.

Serik Belediyespor, which is in the TFF Third League, Group 3 in 2018–19, has 13 wins, 13 draws and 8 losses in 34 matches under the management of Mehmet Şansal. He finished his group 4th by collecting 52 points and qualified for play-offs. He eliminated Karacabey Belediyespor in the play-off semi-finals after 2 matches, 1–0 and 4–2. In the final match played in Adana on 5 Ocak Fatih Terim Stadium, Serik Belediyespor faced Yeni Çorumspor, and lost the chance to be in the TFF Second League after being defeated 4–2 as a result of the penalty shootout, whose normal time and extensions ended 1–1. In the general assembly held before the 2019–20 season, Ramazan Kaçar was elected as the new president. Serik Belediyespor, which started the 2019–20 season in the TFF Third League, Group 1, completed the season in the first place and reached the TFF Second League.The club made a name for itself by pairing up with Süper Lig teams Adana Demirspor, Ankaragücü and Beşiktaş in the Turkish Cup matches.

League appearances 
 TFF Second League: 2020–present
 TFF Third League: 2018–2020
 Regional Amateur League: 2015–2018
 Amateur Level: 1955–2015

Players

Current squad

References

External links
 Serik Belediyespor on TFF.org
 Serik Belediyespor on Facebook
 Serik Belediyespor on Twitter
 Serik Belediyespor on Instagram

Football clubs in Turkey
Sport in Antalya
Association football clubs established in 1955
1955 establishments in Turkey